Jan Michael Joncas (born December 21, 1951) is a Catholic priest of the Archdiocese of Saint Paul and Minneapolis, liturgical theologian, and composer of contemporary Catholic music best known for his hymn "On Eagle's Wings".

Biography 
Joncas was raised in Minneapolis, of Polish descent, attending Nazareth Hall Preparatory Seminary and St. John Vianney Seminary at the University of St. Thomas, earning a bachelor's degree in English there in 1975.

Joncas composed the hymn he is best known for, "On Eagle's Wings", following the death of a friend's father in the late 1970s. It has since been quoted by Joe Biden and covered by Lana Del Rey.

He received a Master of Arts degree in liturgy from the University of Notre Dame in 1978 and went on to study at the Pontifical Liturgical Institute in Rome, earning both his licentiate and doctorate degrees there. He was ordained to the priesthood on May 31, 1980, by Archbishop John Roach. Following this, he taught at the University of St. Thomas, at the University of Notre Dame, and summer courses at the Saint John's School of Theology, also serving as a weekend assistant at parishes throughout the Archdiocese.

In 2003, Joncas was diagnosed with Guillain–Barré syndrome after noticing he lacked the strength to elevate the chalice at Mass. The residual effects of the disorder still prevent him from playing guitar, the instrument on which he composed "On Eagle's Wings".

In 2022, Joncas retired from active ministry and teaching but intends to keep writing music.

Discography
 Singing In the Light (1968)
 On Eagles' Wings (1979; featuring "On Eagle's Wings")
 Every Stone Shall Cry
 Here In Our Midst
 O Joyful Light
 I Have Loved You
 Praise God in Song
 No Greater Love Mass
 Winter Name of God (1988)
 God of Life and of the Living
 Sing Praise and Thanksgiving
 Come to Me
 Mass for John Carroll
 Psallite Mass
 We Come to Your Feast
 A Voice Cries Out
 As the Deer
 God of Life Be Praised
 In the Sight of Angels (2008)
 Christ Be Near (2009).   shelter me  (2020)

Published Works 

 Preaching the Rites of Christian Initiation, Forum Essays 4 (Chicago, IL: Liturgy Training Publications, 1994).
 The Catechism of the Catholic Church on Liturgy and Sacraments (San Jose, CA: Resource Publications, 1995).
 From Sacred Song to Ritual Music: Twentieth Century Understandings of Roman Catholic Worship Music (Collegeville, MN: The Liturgical Press, 1997).
 Co-author with Fr. Michael Driscoll, The Order of Mass: A Roman Missal Study Edition and Workbook (Chicago, IL: Liturgy Training Publications, 2011).
 Within Our Hearts Be Born. The Michael Joncas Hymnary: Advent and Christmas (Portland, OR: Oregon Catholic Press, 2013)
 We Contemplate the Mystery.The Michael Joncas Hymnary: Lent and Triduum (Portland, OR: Oregon Catholic Press, 2015).

See also

 David Haas
 Marty Haugen
 Dan Schutte
 St. Louis Jesuits

References

External links
Oregon Catholic Press: Artists & Events: Artists: Michael Joncas (biography)
GIA Publications: J. Michael Joncas (biography)
University of St. Thomas: Faculty: Rev. Jan Michael Joncas (biography)

1951 births
American Roman Catholic priests
Composers of Christian music
Contemporary Catholic liturgical music
Living people
University of Notre Dame faculty
People with Guillain–Barré syndrome
Roman Catholic Archdiocese of Saint Paul and Minneapolis